TOPAZ may refer to:
 TOPAZ nuclear reactor, a nuclear reactor developed in the Soviet Union
 TOPAZ (think thank), an organisation of the Czech Republic

See also 
 Topaz (disambiguation)